James Thomas Elliott (April 22, 1823 – July 28, 1875) was a United States Representative for the state of Arkansas. He held the position for forty-nine days in 1869.

Background

Born in 1823 A native of Columbus, Georgia, Elliott attended the public schools and studied law. In 1854, he was admitted to the bar and commenced his practice in Camden in Ouachita County, Arkansas. In 1858, he became the president of the Mississippi, Ouachita & Red River Railroad.

On April 4, 1844, he married the former Gugielma Sells, and the couple had four children.

The Elliott House

in 1857, Elliott constructed his Elliott House on West Washington Street in Camden. The Union Army General Frederick Salomon occupied the structure in 1864 during his stay in Camden. The family lived upstairs during the occupation. Their son, Milton Arteles Elliott, was a 13-year-old private in the Confederate States of America Army. Mathew Brady photographed their younger son, William Sells Elliott, on the front porch of the house.

Later, the Elliott House was an archaeological study of the relics of the time that the house was used as a Union hospital. This was during the time prior to the Battle of Poison Springs. Numerous shell casings were found as well as old pottery from hospital usage. The battle was the last significant fight won by the Confederacy. It occurred on April 18, 1864, during the Arkansas phase of the Red River Campaign.

Later life and politics

Elliott was briefly a circuit judge of the Sixth Judicial District of Arkansas from October 2, 1865, to September 15, 1866. He established and edited the South Arkansas Journal in 1867. In this time period, the family lost two daughters, Belle and Emmaline Elliott to yellow fever on the same day.

Reconstruction, KKK murder, call to Congress

During Reconstruction, the U.S. Representative James M. Hinds was assassinated on October 22, 1868, by George A. Clark, a member of the Ku Klux Klan and the secretary of the Democratic Committee of Monroe County, Arkansas.

Elliott was elected as a Republican to the Fortieth Congress to fill the vacancy. He served only from January 13 to March 3, 1869. He died in Arkansas at age 52

Career summary

United States Representative James Thomas Elliott

 Admitted to the bar in 1854
 President of the Mississippi, Ouachita & Red River Railroad in 1858.
 Housed Union General Frederick Salomon and Mathew Brady during the Battle of Poison Springs, in 1864.
 Circuit Judge of the Sixth Judicial District of Arkansas from October 2, 1865, serving until September 15, 1866.
 Republican Party, United States Representative, from Arkansas to the 40th United States Congress, served from January 13, 1869, to March 4, 1869.
 Elected to the Arkansas State Senate in 1870.
 Judge of the Ninth Judicial District 1872–1874, when the State Constitution was adopted.
 Died in Camden, Arkansas, on July 28, 1875; interred with his family at Oakland Cemetery there.

Historical references

His daughter-in-law, Sattie Buskin Elliott, the wife of Milton Elliott, edited, and with the assistance of the ladies in the Arkansas Historical Society of Ouachita County published a book, Garden of Memories,  held in the Library of Congress.

References
Google Books
Politicalgraveyard.com
Ouachitacountyhistoricalsociety.org

External links

1823 births
1875 deaths
People from Columbus, Georgia
People from Camden, Arkansas
Arkansas state court judges
Republican Party Arkansas state senators
19th-century American politicians
Burials in Arkansas
19th-century American judges
Republican Party members of the United States House of Representatives from Arkansas